Nils-Rune Tommy Johansson (born 24 July 1938) is a Swedish former professional ice hockey defenceman. He competed at the 1964 and 1968 Olympics and finished in second and fourth place, respectively. Between 1960 and 1970 he capped 168 times with the Swedish national team, winning the world title in 1962 and finishing second in 1963, 1967, 1969 and 1970.

Johansson never won a Swedish title, but in 1964 he received the Goldpucken Award as the best Swedish player and was selected to the Swedish all-star team. In 1971 he was awarded the Rinkens riddare award, given to the most sportsmanlike player of the Swedish Hockey League. After retiring from competitions he worked as a coach with Färjestads BK, Hanhals IF and IF Mölndal Hockey.

References

1938 births
Living people
Färjestad BK players
Ice hockey players at the 1964 Winter Olympics
Ice hockey players at the 1968 Winter Olympics
Modo Hockey players
Olympic ice hockey players of Sweden
Olympic medalists in ice hockey
Olympic silver medalists for Sweden
Medalists at the 1964 Winter Olympics